Trumpler 14 (Tr 14) is an open cluster with a diameter of , located within the inner regions of the Carina Nebula, approximately  from Earth. Together with the nearby Trumpler 16, they are the main clusters of the Carina OB1 stellar association, which is the largest association in the Carina Nebula, although Trumpler 14 is not as massive or as large as Trumpler 16.

About  stars have been identified in Trumpler 14 and the total mass of the cluster is estimated to be 4,300 .

Age

It is one of the youngest known star clusters, estimates range from 300 to 500 thousand years old. For comparison, the massive super star cluster R136 is about 1 to 2 million years old, and the famous Pleiades is about 115 million years old.

Members
Due to its location within the inner parts of the Carina Nebula, Trumpler 14 is currently undergoing massive star formation. As a result, the star cluster exhibits many stars of late O to early A spectral type, which are very massive (at least 10 solar masses), short-lived and hot. The brightest member is HD 93129, a triple system consisting of three individual class O stars. It also contains HD 93128, an O3.5 V((fc))z star, an extremely hot and young main sequence star.

Future

In a few million years, as its stars die, it will trigger the formation of metal-rich stars, and in a few hundred million years Trumpler 14 will probably dissipate.

Gallery

References

External links
 

Carina Nebula
Open clusters
Carina (constellation)
Trumpler catalog
Star-forming regions